Leroy Orville Barrington Keane (26 June 1937 – 3 July 2010) was a Jamaican National Champion and an All-American track and field athlete at the University of Nebraska.  His son Martin Keane was a Canadian former professional basketball player.

Born in Jamaica W.I., Keane attended Calabar High School between 1953 and 1956. In 1953, Keane broke the hurdles record in class two boys (Jamaica). At the 1957 British West Indies Championships, Keane placed 1st in the 400m hurdles for Jamaica.  At the 1959 and 1960 British West Indies Championships, L. Keane placed in the top 3, in the 110m Hurdles. Also, in the 1960 British West Indies Championships, keane placed 1st in the Pentathlon.

Keane later moved to Toronto, Ontario Canada where he became a coach with the Phoenix track club. Later Keane formed his own track club called the Jamaican Canadian track club (Jacan track club).

In 2004 Keane was honoured with an award from the Calabar Old Boys Association (Canada chapter) for his community contributions.

Sources

External links
 Jamaica Gleaner - Leroy Keane is dead

1937 births
2010 deaths
Athletics (track and field) coaches
Canadian sports coaches
Canadian track and field coaches